
This is a list of aircraft in alphabetical order beginning with 'Df-Dz'.

Df-Dz

DF Helicopters
 DF Helicopters DF333
 DF Helicopters DF334

DFS
(Deutsche Forschungsanstalt für Segelflug)
see also: RRG
 DFS 39
 DFS 40
 DFS 54
 DFS 193
 DFS 194
 DFS 203
 DFS 228
 DFS 230
 DFS 230F (despite designation it was a totally new aircraft)
 DFS 331
 DFS 332
 DFS 346
 DFS B6
 DFS Condor
 DFS E 32
 DFS Einheitsschulflugzeug
 DFS Fliege IIa
 DFS Ha III
 DFS Habicht
 DFS Hangwind
 DFS Hol's der Teufel
 DFS Jacht 71
 DFS Kranich
 DFS Maikäfer
 DFS Mo 6
 DFS Mo 12
 DFS Moazag'otl
 DFS Olympia Meise
 DFS Präsident
 DFS Professor
 DFS Reiher
 DFS Rhönbussard
 DFS Rhönadler
 DFS Rhönsperber
 DFS São Paulo
 DFS Seeadler
 DFS SG 38
 DFS Stanavo
 DFS Weihe

DFW 
(Deutsche Flugzeug-Werke G.m.b.H)
 DFW B.I
 DFW B.II
 DFW C-type
 DFW C.I
 DFW C.II
 DFW C.III
 DFW C.IV
 DFW C.V
 DFW C.VI
 DFW D.I
 DFW D.II
 DFW Dr.I
 DFW T.28 Floh
 DFW T.34-I
 DFW T.34-II
 DFW Mars
 DFW P.1
 DFW Pfiel
 DFW R.I
 DFW R.II
 DFW R.III
 DFW Stahl-Taube
 DFW F 34
 DFW F 37
 D.F.W. Pusher Biplane
 DFW MD 14
 DFW flugboot

DG
(DG Flugzeugbau GmbHpreviously Gläser-Dirks)
 Rolladen-Schneider LS8
 LS10
 DG Flugzeugbau DG-800
 DG Flugzeugbau DG-808
 DG Flugzeugbau DG-1000 S

DGRCN
(Dirección General de Reparaciones y Construcciones Navales - Mexico)
 DGRCN Tonatiuh MX-1

Diablo 
(Diablo Aircraft Co, Stockton, CA)
 Diablo 1929 Biplane

Diamond Aircraft 
 Diamond DA20
 Diamond DV20
 Diamond DA40 Star
 Diamond DA42 TwinStar
 Diamond DA50
 Diamond HK36 Super Dimona
 Diamond D-Jet
 Diamond Dart 280
 Diamond Dart 450

Díaz 
(Amalio Díaz)
 Díaz type C

Dickey
(Shirl Dickey Enterprises, Phoenix, AZ)
Dickey E-Racer Mark 1
Dickey E-Racer Mark 2
Dickey King Racer

Didier ULM
(Francheval, France)
Didier Pti'tAvion

Diehl 
(Diehl Aero-Nautical, Jenks, OK)
 Diehl XTC Hydrolight

Diemert
(Bob Diemert)
 Diemert Defender

Dietrich 
(Dietrich-Gobiet Flugzeugwerke AG - 1922, Richard-Dietrich-Flugzeugbau-GmbH, Dietrich Flugzeugwerke AG, Mannheim)

 Dietrich DP.I
 Dietrich DP.I Sperber 
 Dietrich DP.II
 Dietrich DP.II Bussard
 Dietrich DP.IIa
 Dietrich DP.III (Abandoned) 
 Dietrich DP.IV (Project)  
 Dietrich DP.V (Project) 
 Dietrich DP.VI 
 Dietrich DP.VII
 Dietrich-Gobiet DP.VII 
 Dietrich-Gobiet DP.VIIA
 Dietrich DP.IX
 Dietrich DP.XI
 Dietrich DS.I

Dietz 
((Conrad G) Dietz Laboratories, Cincinnati, OH, 1925: Dietz Aeroplane Co, 815 Herman Ave/33 Hess St, Dayton, OH)
 Dietz C-4
 Dietz 1927 Biplane
 Dietz 1928 Biplane
 Dietz Nighthawk
 Dietz Paraplane
 Dietz Special a.k.a. 'The Comet'

Dietz-Schreiber 
 Dietz-Schreiber Skylark

DiFoGa
(Frits Diepens Ford Garage)
 DiFoGa 421

DINFIA 
(Dirección Nacional de Fabricación e Investigación Aeronáutica - Spanish language for "National Directorate of Aeronautical Manufacturing and Research").
 DINFIA IA 24
 DINFIA IA 25 Mañque
 DINFIA IA 28
 DINFIA IA 31
 DINFIA IA 32 Chingolo
 DINFIA IA 35 Huanquero
 DINFIA IA 35 Type 1A
 DINFIA IA 35 Type 1U
 DINFIA IA 35 Type II
 DINFIA IA 35 Type III
 DINFIA IA 35 Type IV
 DINFIA Constancia II
 DINFIA Pandora
 DINFIA IA 35 Guaraní I
 DINFIA IA 38 Naranjero
 DINFIA IA 45 Querandi
 FMA IA 50 Guaraní II

DirectFly
(DirectFly sro, Hluk, Czech Republic)
DirectFly Alto
DirectFly ArGO

Discovery Aviation 
 Discovery Aviation Model 201

Distar
(Distar Air)
Distar UFM-13 Lambada
Distar Samba XXL

Dittmar
Dittmar HD 153 Motor-Möwe

Dixie 
(Charles W Lay, Cincinnati, OH)
 Dixie 1924 Monoplane

Dixon 
(Jess Dixon, Andalusia, AL)
 Dixon 1936 Helicopter

Dixon 
(Tom Dixon, Burlington, NC)
 Dixon Special

DJB 
(DJB Aeroplane Co (Harry Deuther, Junkin & Brukner), the basis for Weaver Aircraft Co. )
 DJB Flying Boat
 DJB Scout

D.K.D.
see:Działowskich

DLR
(Deutsches Zentrum für Luft- und Raumfahrt e.V. (DLR) - German Aerospace Center)
 DLR HY4

D.N.F.
(Dupperon, Niepce & Fetterer)
 D.N.F. 1916 bomber

Doak 
(Doak Aircraft Co Inc, Torrance, CA )
 Doak DRD-1
 Doak Model 16
 Doak VZ-4

Doak & Deeds 
((Edward) Doak & (Woody) Deeds Aircraft Co, Culver City, CA)
 Doak & Deeds Sportsman

Dobi 
(Jurgis Dobkevičius - Lithuania)
 Dobi-I
 Dobi-II
 Dobi-III

Doblhoff 
(Friedrich Baron von Doblhoff)
 Doblhoff WNF 342

Dockery-Barneko 
(Leland Dockery and Ralph Barnecko, Valparaiso, IN)
 Dockery-Barneko S-1

Doerflein 
(Howard Doerflein, Milwaukee WI.)
 Doerflein Sportsman

Dokuchayev 
(Aleksnadr Yakovlevich Dokuchayev)
 Dokuchayev 1910 biplane
 Dokuchayev No.2 biplane
 Dokuchayev No.3 biplane
 Dokuchayev No.4 biplane
 Dokuchayev No.5 monoplane
 Dokuchayev No.6 biplane
 Dokuchayev 1910 biplane (Aleksnadr Yakovlevich Dokuchayev)
 Dokuchayev 1912 sesquiplane
 Dokuchayev 1914 biplane
 Dokuchayev 1915 sesquiplane trainer
 Dokuchayev 1916 monoplane
 Dokuchayev 1916 biplane

Doflug 
(Dornier-Werke AG)
 Doflug D-3800
 Doflug D-3801
 Doflug D-3802
 Doflug D-3802A
 Doflug D-3803

Doman 
(1945: (Glidden S) Doman-(Clinton W) Frasier Helicopters Inc, New York, NY and Stamford, CT, 1949: Doman Helicopters Inc, Danbury, CT 195?: Berlin Doman Helicopters Inc (Europe).)
 Doman D-10B
 Doman D-11
 Doman LZ-1
 Doman LZ-1A
 Doman LZ-2A Pelican
 Doman LZ-4
 Doman LZ-5
 Doman H-31
 Doman HC-1

Dominion 
(Dominion Aircraft Corporation Ltd, Renton, WA)
 Dominion Skytrader 800

Donnet-Denhaut 
(Société des Établissements Donnet-Denhaut)
 Donnet-Denhaut flying boat
 Donnet-Denhaut Hispano-Suiza 140/150 hp
 Donnet-Denhaut Lorraine 160 hp
 Donnet-Denhaut Canton-Unné 160 hp
 Donnet-Denhaut Hispano-Suiza 200 hp RR
 Donnet-Denhaut Hispano-Suiza 275 hp
 Donnet-Denhaut Bimoteur
 Donnet-Denhaut DD-1
 Donnet-Denhaut DD-2
 Donnet-Denhaut DD-3
 Donnet-Denhaut DD-8
 Donnet-Denhaut DD-9
 Donnet-Denhaut DD-10
 Donnet-Denhaut P.10
 Donnet-Denhaut P.15
 Donnet H.B.3

Donnet-Lévêque 
 Donnet-Leveque Type A
 Donnet-Leveque Type B
 Donnet-Leveque Type C
 Donnet-Leveque 1912 flying boat
 Donnet-Leveque 1913 flying boat racer
 Donnet-Leveque PD

Dopourdois 
(Georges Dopourdois)
 Dopourdois DV.219

Dorand 
(Colonel Émile Dorand, director of the Section Technique de l'Aéronautique (STAé) at Chalais-Meudon / Société d`Études des Giravions Dorand)
 Dorand 1908 Avion Militaire
 Dorand 1909 Laboratoire
 Dorand 1911 biplane
 Dorand AR.1
 Dorand AR.2
 Dorand DO.1
 Dorand armoured interceptor
 Dorand BU
 Dorand flying boat

Dorand 

(Réne Dorand / Société d'Etudes des Giravions Dorand / Société Francaise Du Gyroplane)
 Dorand DH.011
 Dorand G.II Gyroplane
 Dorand G.20 Gyroplane

Dorland 
(L S Dorland, San Francisco, CA)
 Dorland Helicopter

Dormoy 
(Etienne Dormoy, Detroit, MI and Dayton, OH)
 Dormoy 1919 Biplane
 Dormoy 1920 Biplane
 Dormoy Bathtub

Dorna 
(H F Dorna Company)
 Dorna Parandeh Abi
 Dorna Parandeh Sefid
 Dorna Free Bird

Dornier 
(Dornier Werke GmbH) (During World War 1, Dornier designed for Zeppelin-Lindau)
 Dornier Cs.I
 Dornier Gs I
 Dornier Gs II
 Dornier Do A Libelle and Libelle II
 Dornier Do B Merkur
 Dornier Do B Bal Merkur II
 Dornier Do C
 Dornier C III Komet I
 Dornier Do C2
 Dornier Do C3
 Dornier Do C4
 Dornier Do D
 Dornier Do E
 Dornier Do F
 Dornier G I Greif
 Dornier Do H Falke
 Dornier Do H Seefalke
 Dornier Do J Wal
 Dornier Do J B
 Dornier Do J G
 Dornier Do J K
 Dornier Do J II
 Dornier Do K1
 Dornier Do K2
 Dornier Do K3
 Dornier L1 Delphin I
 Dornier L2 Delphin II
 Dornier L3 Delphin III
 Dornier Do N
 Dornier Do O
 Dornier Do P
 Dornier Do Q
 Dornier Do R2 Superwal
 Dornier Do R4 Superwal
 Dornier Do S
 Dornier Do T
 Dornier Do U
 Dornier Do V
 Dornier Do X
 Dornier Do Y
 Dornier Do 10
 Dornier Do 11
 Dornier Do 12 Libelle III
 Dornier Do 13
 Dornier Do 14
 Dornier Do 15
 Dornier Do 16 Wal
 Dornier Do 17
 Dornier Do 18
 Dornier Do 19
 Dornier Do 20
 Dornier Do 22
 Dornier Do 23
 Dornier Do 24
 Dornier Do 25
 Dornier Do 26
 Dornier Do 27
 Dornier Do 28
 Dornier Do 29
 Dornier Do 31
 Dornier Do 32
 Dornier Do 34
 Dornier 128
 Dornier Do 200
 Dornier Do 212
 Dornier Do 214
 Dornier Do 215
 Dornier Do 216
 Dornier Do 217
 Dornier 228
 Dornier Do 317
 Dornier Do 318
 Dornier 328
 Dornier Do 335 Pfeil
 Dornier Do 435
 Dornier Do 535
 Dornier Do 635
 Dornier 628
 Dornier Do 417
 Dornier 728
 Dornier Alpha Jet
 Dornier Spatz
 Dornier Libelle (1921)
 Dornier Libelle II
 Dornier Libelle III
 Dornier Delphin I
 Dornier Delphin II
 Dornier Delphin III
 Dornier Falke
 Dornier Greif
 Dornier Merkur
 Dornier Merkur II
 Dornier Komet I
 Dornier Komet II
 Dornier Komet III
 Dornier Seefalke
 Dornier Superwal
 Dornier Wal
 Dornier Pfeil
 Dornier Schneider trophy projects
 Dornier LTA

Dornier Seawings
 Dornier Seawings Seastar

Dornier (Altenrhein)
see FFA

Douglas 
(Charles M Ford, Al M Williams, and members of the Douglas Flying Club, Douglas, AZ)
 Douglas 1909 Biplane

Douglas 
see also: Davis-Douglas, McDonnell-Douglas
 Douglas A-1 Skyraider
 Douglas A-2
 Douglas A-3 Skywarrior
 Douglas A-4 (target drone)
 Douglas A-4 Skyhawk
 Douglas A-6
 Douglas A-20 Havoc
 Douglas A-24 Banshee
 Douglas A-26 Invader
 Douglas A-33
 Douglas A-42
 Douglas AC-47 Spooky
 Douglas AD Skyraider
 Douglas A2D Skyshark
 Douglas A3D Skywarrior
 Douglas A4D Skyhawk
 Douglas B-7
 Douglas B-11
 Douglas B-18 Bolo
 Douglas B-19
 Douglas B-22
 Douglas B-23 Dragon
 Douglas B-26 Invader
 Douglas B-31
 Douglas B-42 Mixmaster
 Douglas B-43 Jetmaster
 Douglas B-66 Destroyer
 Douglas BD
 Douglas BLR-2
 Douglas BT-1
 Douglas BT-2
 Douglas BT-30
 Douglas BTD Destroyer
 Douglas BT2D
 Douglas C-1 Milirole
 Douglas C-9 Skytrain II
 Douglas C-21 Dolphin
 Douglas C-24
 Douglas C-26 Dolphin
 Douglas C-29 Dolphin
 Douglas C-32
 Douglas C-33
 Douglas C-34
 Douglas C-38
 Douglas C-39
 Douglas C-41 (modified Douglas C-33)
 Douglas C-41A (modified Douglas DC-3A)
 Douglas C-42
 Douglas C-47 Skytrain
 Douglas C-48
 Douglas C-49
 Douglas C-50
 Douglas C-51
 Douglas C-52
 Douglas C-53 Skytrooper
 Douglas C-54 Skymaster
 Douglas C-58
 Douglas C-67 Dragon
 Douglas C-68
 Douglas C-74 Globemaster
 Douglas C-84
 Douglas C-110
 Douglas C-112 Liftmaster
 Douglas C-114 Skymaster
 Douglas C-115 Skymaster
 Douglas C-116 Skymaster
 Douglas C-117 Super Dakota
 Douglas C-118 Liftmaster
 Douglas C-124 Globemaster II
 Douglas C-129 Super Dakota
 Douglas C-132
 Douglas C-133 Cargomaster
 Douglas CG-17
 Douglas F-3
 Douglas F-6 Skyray
 Douglas F-10 Skyknight
 Douglas F-24
 Douglas F3D Skyknight
 Douglas F4D Skyray
 Douglas F5D Skylancer
 Douglas F6D Missileer
 Douglas FD
 Douglas JD
 Douglas O-2
 Douglas O-5
 Douglas O-7
 Douglas O-8
 Douglas O-9
 Douglas O-14
 Douglas O-22
 Douglas O-25
 Douglas O-29
 Douglas O-31
 Douglas O-32
 Douglas O-34
 Douglas O-35
 Douglas O-36
 Douglas O-38
 Douglas O-43
 Douglas O-44
 Douglas O-46
 Douglas O-48
 Douglas O-53
 Douglas OA-3
 Douglas OA-4
 Douglas OA-5
 Douglas OD
 Douglas O2D
 Douglas P-48
 Douglas P-70 Nighthawk
 Douglas PD
 Douglas P2D
 Douglas P3D
 Douglas RD
 Douglas R2D
 Douglas R3D
 Douglas R4D
 Douglas R5D
 Douglas R6D
 Douglas SBD Dauntless
 Douglas SB2D
 Douglas T2D
 Douglas T3D
 Douglas TBD Devastator
 Douglas TB2D Skypirate
 Douglas X-3 Stiletto
 Douglas XP-472
 Douglas XS-3
 Douglas 1-X
 Douglas 1 Special
 Douglas 7
 Douglas 8
 Douglas 640
 Douglas Boston
 Douglas Cloudster II
 Douglas Commuter
 Douglas D558-I Skystreak
 Douglas D558-II Skyrocket
 Douglas DA-1 Ambassador
 Douglas Dakota
 Douglas DAM-1
 Douglas DB.1
 Douglas DB.7
 Douglas DB.19
 Douglas DC-1
 Douglas DC-2
 Douglas DC-3
 Douglas DC-4
 Douglas DC-4E no relation to DC-4/C-54
 Douglas DC-5
 Douglas DC-6
 Douglas DC-7
 Douglas DC-8
 Douglas DC-9
 Douglas DC-10
 Douglas DF
 Douglas DF-151
 Douglas DF-195
 Douglas Digby
 Douglas Dolphin
 Douglas DOS
 Douglas DST
 Douglas DT
 Douglas DT-202
 Douglas DWC
 Douglas DXD
 Douglas FP-1
 Douglas FP-2
 Douglas Havoc
 Douglas HXD
 Douglas L2D
 Douglas LXD1
 Douglas M-1
 Douglas M-2
 Douglas M-3
 Douglas M-4
 Douglas MO-2B
 Douglas Navy Experimental Type D Flying Boat
 Douglas Navy Experimental Type D Transport
 Douglas Navy Type D Transport
 Douglas Navy Type 0 Transport
 Douglas SDW
 Douglas Sinbad
 Douglas Weilandcraft
 Douglas CC-129 Dakota Canadian Armed Forces

Douglas-Northrop 
(see #Douglas)

Douheret
 Douhéret Hélicoplane

Dova Aircraft
(Paskov, Czech Republic)
Dova DV-1 Skylark
Dova DV-2 Infinity

Dow 
(Robert W Dow, Flint, MI)
 Dow A-1

Downer 
(C L Downer, Salt Lake City, UT)
 Downer 1910 Quintuplane

Downer 
(Downer Aircraft Industries Inc, Alexandria, MN)
 Downer 260

Doyle 
(Doyle Aero Corp, 3104 Elm Ave, Baltimore, MD)
 Doyle O-2 Oriole
 Doyle O-3 Oriole a.k.a. O-2 Special

Doyle 
(Richard H Doyle, Franklin Park, IL)
 Doyle gyroplane
 Doyle Moon Maid

Doyle 
( (Herbert Charles) Doyle, Rochester, NY)
 Doyle 1911 Biplane

Doyle-Brown 
(Doyle-(R M) Brown Motorplane Co, New York, NY)
 Doyle-Brown Motorplane

Doyn 
(Doyn Aircraft, Wichita, KS)
 Doyn Dart I (Cessna 170,172 and 175 conversions)
 Doyn Dart II (Piper Apache conversions)

Drachen Studio Kecur
(Drachen Studio Kecur GmbH, Mettmann, Germany)
Drachen Studio Kecur Royal 912

Dragon
 Dragon 150
 Dragon 200

Dragon Fly
(Dragon fly Aircraft Corporation)
 Dragon Fly monoplane

Dreifke 
(Ramon Dreifke, St Louis, MO)
 Dreifke D-2

Dresden 
 Dresden 152

Drezet 
(Maurice Drezet)
 Drezet 01
 Drezet-Mirouze 02 Drezair (Maurice Drezet and Alain Mirouze)

Driggers 
(Willard A Driggers, 1530 Olive St, Washington, DC, and Willow Grove, PA)
 Driggers D1-A
 Driggers D2-A

Driggs
(Driggs Aircraft Corp/Michigan Screw Co, Lansing, MI)
 Driggs Dart 1 a.k.a. DJ-1
 Driggs Dart 2
 Driggs Skylark 3

Driggs-Johnson
( (Ivan) Driggs-(E A) Johnson Airplane & Supply Co, Dayton, OH)
 Driggs-Johnson DJ-1 Bumblebee
 Driggs-Johnson Canary a.k.a. DJ-1

DRS Technologies 
 DRS Technologies Neptune
DRS Sentry HP

Druiff-Neate
 Druiff-Neate Cycloplane

Druine
 Druine RD.1
 Druine RD.30
 Druine Aigle 777
 Druine D.3 Turbulent
 Druine D.31 Turbulent
 Druine D.4 Turbulent
 Druine D.5 Turbi
 Druine D.60 Condor
 Druine D.61 Condor
 Druine D.62 Condor

DS
(Lebanon)
 DS-1 Papillon

DSA
(Delft Student Aeroclub (DSA))
Lambach HL.I
Lambach HL.II

D.S.
 D.S. No.1 Papillon

DSK 
(Duster Sailplane Kits)
 DSK Duster

DSK Airmotive 
(DSK Airmotive, Ft Walton Beach, FL)
 DSK Airmotive DSK-1 Hawk
 DSK Airmotive DSK-2 Golden Hawk

DTA sarl
(Montélimar, France)
 DTA Alizés
 DTA Combo
 DTA Diva
 DTA Dynamic
 DTA Evolution
 DTA Feeling
 DTA J-RO
 DTA Magic
 DTA Voyageur

Duane's Hangar
(Patrick Duane, Liberty, SC)
Duane's Hangar Ultrababy

du Temple 
 du Temple Monoplane

Dube
(Aviation Normand Dube, Sainte-Anne-des-Plaines, Quebec, Canada)
Norman Dube Aerocruiser
Norman Dube Aerocruiser Plus
Norman Dube Aerocruiser 450 Turbo

Duben 
 Duben helicopter

Dubna
(Dubna Machine-Building Plant Production Technical Complex Co. Ltd,)
 Dubna-2 OSA
 Dubna 4

Ducournau 
(Jean-Marc Ducournau)
 Ducournau HLM.01

Ducrot 
(Vittorio Ducrot)
 Ducrot SLD

Dudakov-Konstantinov 
 Dudakov-Konstantinov U-1
 Dudakov-Konstantinov MU-1

Dudek 
(Stan Dudek, Somerville, NJ)
 Dudek V-1 Sportplane

Dudek 
(Albert Dudek, Cleveland, OH)
 Dudek-Beachey Pusher (replica Beachey-Eaton 1914 Biplane)

Dudek Paragliders
(Bydgoszcz, Poland)
Dudek Action
Dudek Air-Light
Dudek Alt
Dudek Atak
Dudek Bi-Light
Dudek Coden
Dudek Colt
Dudek Condor
Dudek Elf
Dudek Freeway
Dudek Guliwer
Dudek Hadron
Dudek Jumbo
Dudek Lux
Dudek Mach 1.1
Dudek Manta
Dudek Marlin
Dudek Max
Dudek Nemo
Dudek Nucleon
Dudek Optic
Dudek Orca
Dudek Patrol
Dudek Plasma
Dudek Plus
Dudek Reaction
Dudek Rex
Dudek Shark
Dudek Snake
Dudek Synthesis
Dudek Top
Dudek Traper
Dudek Twix
Dudek Universal
Dudek Vip
Dudek Vox
Dudek Wezyr
Dudek Zagzig
Dudek Zak Speed

Dudley 
 Dudley Glass Slipper

Dudley Watt 
 Dudley Watt D.W.2

Dufaux
(Dufaux, Armand and Henri, Switzerland)
 Dufaux helicopter
 Dufaux triplane
 Dufaux 4
 Dufaux 5
 Dufaux fighter
 Dufaux Avion-Canon

 Dufaux C.2 Fighter

Dufour
 Dufour No.1

Duigan 
 Duigan glider
 Duigan pusher biplane
 Duigan tractor biplane

Dudley Watt
 Dudley Watt D.W.2

Dumbravă 
(Ioan Dumbravă)
 Dumbravă Iaşi-1

Dumod 
(Dumod Corp, Opa-Locka, FL)
 Dumod I
 Dumod Liner
 Dumod Infinité I
 Dumod Infinité II

Duncan (aircraft constructor) 
 Duncan Special a.k.a. DX-1 Sport

Dunham 
(Erwin J Dunham, Hamburg, NY)
 Dunham 1927 Monoplane

Dunn 
((William G) Dunn Mfg Co, Clarinda, IA)
 Dunn K-5 Cruzaire

Dunn-Tate 
(Harry & Frank Dunn, Anderson, IN)
 Dunn-Tate 1910 Biplane

Dunne 
(J. W. Dunne)
see also: Burgess-Dunne
 Dunne D.1
 Dunne D.2
 Dunne D.3
 Dunne D.4
 Dunne D.5
 Dunne D.6
 Dunne D.7 (Dunne-Capper monoplane)
 Dunne D.8
 Dunne D.9
 Dunne D.10

Dupau 
(Marcel Dupau)
 Dupau 12 Papy-on

DuPont
(Dupont Aerospace)
 Dupont Aerospace DP-2

Dupperon-Niepce-Fetterer
 Dupperon-Niepce-Fetterer 1916 bomber

Dupuy
(Roger Dupuy)
 Dupuy 40

Durand 
(William H Durand, 84 St & McKinley Ave)
 Durand A-45
 Durand Mk V
 Durand XD-85

Duranton 
 Duranton DE.01 Junior

Durand et Delaville
(Claude Durand and Delaville)
 Durand et Delaville RB.01 Beauregard

Durandeaux 
(Durandeaux)
 Durandeaux D.510

Durant 
( (Rex C "Cliff") Durant Aircraft Corp, Durant Field, 82 Ave at E 14 St, Oakland, CA)
 Durant Tour Plane (Standard J-1 Conversions)

Durban 
(Durban Aircraft, South Africa)
 Durban Aerial II - formerly "Genair Aeriel 2", a Piel Emeraude built under licence

Durenleau 
(René Durenleau, Franklin, VT)
 Durenleau A-1 Biddy Buddy

Durley 
(Bill Durley)
 Durl-E-Aire- parasol wing amateur built aircraft, one built

Duruble 
(Roland Duruble)
 Duruble RD-02 Edelweiss
 Duruble RD-03 Edelweiss

DUS
(Jerzy Dabrowski and Antoni Uszacki)
 DUS III Ptapta

Duverne-Saran
(Duverne & Saran)
 Duverne-Saran 01

Dux Factory (sometimes anglicized as Duks or Dooks)

 Dux Meller I (a.k.a. Duks)
 Dux Meller II
 Dux Meller III
 Dux No.2 pusher monoplane
 Dux 1917 twin pusher
 Dux Military
 Dux twin-engine
 Bleriot XI Dux

Dvorak 
(George J. Dvorak, Redding, CA)
 Dvorak MiniOne

Dwight-Lund 
 Dwight-Lund 1911 Aeroplane

Dycer 
((Charles F & Edward A) Dycer Airport Corp, 136 St & Western Ave, Los Angeles, CA)
 Dycer Sportplane

Dye 
(Elmer F Dye, Encanto, CA)
 Dye Dart Sport

Dye-Morrow 
(Elmer F Dye & Ed Morrow, Encanto and San Diego, CA)
 Dye-Morrow LW

Dyer 
(Stephen E Dyer, Aurora, CO)
 Dycer Dycercraft

Dyke 
((John W) Dyke Aircraft, Fairborn, OH)
 Dyke JD-1 Delta
 Dyke JD-2 Manta Delta
 Dyke Stingray

Dyle et Bacalan
(Société Dyle et Bacalan à Bordeaux / Société Anonyme de Travaux Dyle et Bacalan)
 Dyle et Bacalan DB-10
 Dyle et Bacalan DB-20
 Dyle et Bacalan DB-30
 Dyle et Bacalan DB-40
 Dyle et Bacalan DB-50
 Dyle et Bacalan DB-60
 Dyle et Bacalan DB-70
 Dyle et Bacalan DB-80
 Dyle et Bacalan DB-81
 Dyle et Bacalan DB-90
 Dyle et Bacalan AB-20
 Dyle et Bacalan AB-21
 Dyle et Bacalan AB-22
 Dyle et Bacalan AB-80
 Dyle et Bacalan LH-70

Dyn'Aéro
 Dyn'Aéro CR.100
 Dyn'Aéro CR.120
 Dyn'Aéro MCR01 VLA Sportster
 Dyn'Aéro MCR01 Club
 Dyn'Aéro MCR01 ULC
 Dyn'Aéro MCR4S
 Dyn'Aéro Twin-R
 Dyn'Aéro ELA-1
 Dyn'Aéro MCR2S Ibis
 Dyn'Aéro Pickup
 Dyn'Aéro Three seat
 Dyn'Aéro Four seat
 Dyn'Aéro Four seat Performance
 Dyn'Aéro CITEC
 Dyn'Aéro MCR R180
 Dyn'Aéro MCR R180 Limousine

Dynali 
(Dynali Helicopter Company)
Dynali H2
Dynali H2S
Dynali H3 Easyflyer

Dynalifter 
 Dynalifter DL-100

Dynamic OK
 Dynamic OK WT-9

Dynamic Sport
(Kielce, Poland)
Dynamic Sport Climber
Dynamic Sport Enigma
Dynamic Sport Gravis
Dynamic Sport Magnum
Dynamic Sport Raven
Dynamic Sport Rocket
Dynamic Sport Viper

Dyott 
(G.M. Dyott)
 Dyott 1913 monoplane
 Dyott Bomber

D'Yves Air Pub
(La Chapelle-en-Vexin, France)
D'Yves Yvasion 2000
D'Yves Mikalight
D'Yves Titanox
D'Yves Single-Seater Trike
D'Yves Airmax Double-Seater Trike
D'Yves Double-Seater Trike

Działowskich
(Stanislav Działowskich)
 Działowski D.K.D.1
 Działowski D.K.D.3
 Działowski D.K.D.4
 Działowski D.K.D.5
 Działowski D.K.D.6
 Działowski D.K.D.7
 Działowski D.K.D.8
 Działowski D.K.D.10 Aeromobil

References

Further reading

External links

 List of aircraft (Df-Dz)

fr:Liste des aéronefs (C-D)